In the field of personality psychology, Machiavellianism is a personality trait centered on manipulativeness, callousness, and indifference to morality. The psychological trait derives its name from the political theorist Niccolò Machiavelli, as psychologists Richard Christie and Florence Geis used edited and truncated statements inspired by his works to study variations in human behaviors. Their Mach IV test, a 20-question, Likert-scale personality survey, became the standard self-assessment tool and scale of the Machiavellianism construct. Those who score high on the scale (High Machs) are more likely to have a high level of deceitfulness and a cynical, unempathetic temperament.

It is one of the dark triad traits, along with the subclinical versions of narcissism and psychopathy. Despite having the same name, it is unrelated to his political ideology, also sometimes dubbed Machiavellianism.

Core features
In developing the construct studying manipulators, Christie theorized that they would possess the following characteristics:

1. A relative lack of affect in interpersonal relationships: Manipulators do not empathize with their victims. The more empathy one has, Christie says, the less likely one will manipulate a person to do their bidding.

2. A lack of concern for conventional morality: The manipulator is not concerned with the morality of behaviors such as lying and cheating.

3. A lack of psychopathology (mental illness): Manipulators usually have an instrumentalist view of the world, which shows a lack of psychosis or other mental impairments.

4. Low ideological commitment.

Five Factor Model
Under the recently devised Five-Factor Model of Machiavellianism, three characteristics underlie the construct:
 Antagonism: manipulativeness, cynicism, selfishness, callousness, and arrogance.
 Planfulness: deliberation and orderliness.
 Agency: achievement-striving, assertiveness, self-confidence, emotional invulnerability, activity and competence.

Origin of the construct
In the 1960s, Richard Christie and Florence L. Geis wanted to study the thought processes and actions of those who manipulated others, and developed a test using a selection of statements, including a few truncated and edited sentences from Machiavelli's works as test items, naming the construct "Machiavellianism" after him.  They wanted to assess whether or not those who were in agreement with the statements would behave differently than others who disagreed, specifically in regards to manipulative actions. Their Mach IV test, a 20-question, Likert-scale personality survey, became the standard self-assessment tool of the Machiavellianism construct. Using their scale, Christie and Geis conducted multiple experimental tests that showed that the interpersonal strategies and behavior of "high Machs" and "low Machs" differ. People scoring high on the scale (high Machs) tend to endorse manipulative statements, and behave accordingly, contrary to those who score lowly (low Machs). Their basic results have been widely replicated. Measured on the Mach IV scale, males score, on average, slightly higher on Machiavellianism than females.

The Mach IV test influenced the creation of assessment called the Dirty Dozen, which contains 12 items, and the Short Dark Triad, composed of 27 items. More recently, in response to criticisms of the Mach-IV, researchers developed the Five-Factor Machiavellianism Inventory (FFMI), which attempts to include concepts (like being calculated and planful) that are not adequately captured by the Mach-IV.

Genetics and environment
Several behavioral genetics studies on the dark triad have shown that Machiavellianism has both significantly genetic and environmental influences. One of the studies noted that while Machiavellianism is heritable to a substantial degree, it can also influenced by the shared-environment (i.e sibling groups) slightly more than narcissism and psychopathy. Other traits associated with machiavellianism are influenced by genetics as well, as one study notes that "The co-occurrence of alexithymia and Machiavellianism was most heavily influenced by genetic factors, and to a lesser but significant extent by non-shared environmental factors." Machiavellianism is also heavily correlated with primary psychopathy which is itself strongly heritable. A study on the "core" of dark triad traits also emphasized that both of the residuals of Machiavellianism had "significant genetic components".

Research on children
There has also been extensive research on Machiavellianism in young children and adolescents, via a measure dubbed the "Kiddie Mach" test. Peer reports suggest that children higher in Machiavellianism exhibit behaviors such as using both prosocial and coercive strategies based on how much is to be gained in a situation, and they tend to manipulate indirectly. Children who score highly on the Machiavellianism scale tend to be more successful in manipulation, do it more frequently, and are judged as better at manipulation than those who score lower. Parental levels of Machiavellianism seem to have a slight effect on the child's own level. This indicates that children develop Machiavellian 
traits on their own as time progresses. Machiavellianism is also correlated with childhood aggression, especially concerning the control of social hierarchies. Studies have found a clear trend upwards with respect to Machiavellianism from late childhood to adolescence, when levels of Machiavellianism are thought to peak. From adolescence throughout adulthood there is a significant and steady downward trend with regard to levels of Machiavellianism, until the age of 65 where an overall lifetime minimum is reached.

Peer ratings of Machiavellian children are inconsistent, with some researchers reporting that Machiavellian children are rated as popular, and some reporting that they are less well liked by peers.

Motivation
A 1992 review described the motivation of those high on the Machiavellianism scale as related to cold selfishness and pure instrumentality, and those high on the trait were assumed to pursue their motives (e.g. sex, achievement, sociality) in duplicitous ways. More recent research on the motivations of high Machs compared to low Machs found that they gave high priority to money, power, and competition and relatively low priority to community building, self-love, and family commitment. High Machs admitted to focusing on unmitigated achievement and winning at any cost.

The research on behaviors which high Machs engage in suggest that they are willing to achieve their goals by bending and breaking rules, cheating, and stealing. People high in Machiavellianism are able to easily switch between working with others to taking advantage of others to achieve their goals, and they are more willing to do things others see as terrible or immoral.

Mental abilities
Due to their skill at interpersonal manipulation, there has often been an assumption that high Machs possess superior intelligence, or ability to understand other people in social situations. Recent research provides some support for this assumption. However, other research has established that Machiavellianism is unrelated to IQ.

Furthermore, studies on emotional intelligence have found that high Machiavellianism is usually associated with low emotional intelligence as assessed by both performance and questionnaire measures. Both emotional empathy and emotion recognition have been shown to have negative correlations with Machiavellianism. Additionally, research has shown that Machiavellianism is unrelated to a more advanced theory of mind, that is, the ability to anticipate what others are thinking in social situations. However, some studies have suggested the contrary viewpoint that high Machiavellianism is associated with excellent theory of mind skills.

When it comes to manipulation, individuals high in Machiavellianism may, according to Bereczkei, "have certain cognitive and social skills that enable them to properly adapt to the challenges of environmental circumstances". They also are incredibly perceptive to the presence of others, and feign altruism to enhance their reputation.

Dark Triad

In 1998, John McHoskey, William Worzel, and Christopher Szyarto proposed that narcissism, Machiavellianism, and psychopathy are more or less interchangeable in normal samples. Delroy L. Paulhus and McHoskey debated these perspectives at an American Psychological Association conference, inspiring a body of research that continues to grow in the published literature. Delroy Paulhus and Kevin Williams found enough differences between the traits to suggest that they were distinct despite their similarities, thus the concept of a "triad" of offensive personality traits was conceptualized. There has been research on Machiavellianism using various dark triad measures, including the Short Dark Triad (SD3), and the Dark Triad Dirty Dozen test.

Psychopathy
Many psychologists consider Machiavellianism to be essentially indistinguishable from psychopathy, as they both share manipulative tendencies and cold callousness as their primary attributes. According to John McHoskey, the MACH-IV test is merely "a global measure of psychopathy in noninstitutionalized populations". Both psychopaths and Machiavellians score low on conscientiousness and agreeableness, and they often are dismissive of social norms and ethics.

Many other psychologists state that while Machiavellianism and psychopathy overlap heavily, there is much evidence to suggest that they are distinct personality constructs. Psychologists who stress the differences between Machiavellianism and psychopathy state that psychopaths differ from individuals high in Machiavellianism in that they are impulsive, tend to be reckless, and they lack long term planning skills. Delroy Paulhus and others have stated that this difference between the two traits is often underappreciated. High Machs have been described as "master manipulators" and far better at manipulation than psychopaths and narcissists.

Narcissism

Individuals high in Machiavellianism and narcissism both manipulate to improve their reputations, and how they appear to others. Individuals high in the two traits do this as a form of self aggrandizement to help their chances of success in a given situation. Machiavellianism scores were positively associated with aspects of narcissism such as entitlement and exploitativeness, and inversely associated with adaptive narcissistic tendencies, like self-sufficiency. Studies have also shown that Machiavellians are more realistic about their character, while narcissists are less realistic about theirs. Compared to High Machs, narcissists are less malevolent and show a more socially positive personality. They also have higher levels of self-rated happiness.

White collar crime

Research has shown that individuals high in Machiavellianism may be more willing to engage in white collar crimes. Delroy Paulhus has stated that Machiavellianism is the main trait for con artists, and not psychopathy, stating that:

Although direct research on this topic is difficult, it seems clear that malevolent stockbrokers such as Bernie Madoff do not qualify as psychopaths: They are corporate Machiavellians who use deliberate, strategic procedures for exploiting others. A genuine psychopath, even at the subclinical level, lacks the self-control to orchestrate the schemes of a shrewd stockbroker.

Relations with other personality traits

Big Five

Mach-IV scores are negatively correlated with agreeableness (r = −0.47) and conscientiousness (r = −0.34), two dimensions of the "big five" personality model (NEO-PI-R). The FFMI corrects for this by including aspects of high conscientiousness in the scale (e.g. order, deliberation). Additionally, Machiavellianism correlates more highly with the honesty-humility dimension of the six-factor HEXACO model than with any of the big five dimensions. Machiavellianism has also been located within the interpersonal circumplex, which consists of the two independent dimensions of agency and communion. Agency refers to the motivation to succeed and to individuate the self, whereas communion refers to the motivation to merge with others and to support group interests. Machiavellianism lies in the quadrant of the circumplex defined by high agency and low communion. Machiavellianism has been found to lie diagonally opposite from a circumplex construct called self-construal, a tendency to prefer communion over agency. This suggests that people high in Machiavellianism do not simply wish to achieve, they wish to do so at the expense of (or at least without regard to) others.

Hot and cold empathy 
There are two distinct types of empathy which people use to relate to each other which are referred to as hot and cold empathy. Cold empathy refers to the understanding of how others might react to one's actions or a certain event. Hot empathy refers to the emotional reaction others might have to the emotions of another person. People high in Machiavellianism tend to have a better understanding of cold empathy and do not feel hot empathy which explains why they seem cold and uncaring. Some studies have suggested that Machiavellians are deficient only at the level of affective empathy (sharing of emotions), whereas their cognitive empathy is intact, even high. Another study suggested that high Machs are deficient at both kinds  of empathy. Studies also assert that high Machs don't feel guilt over the consequences of their manipulations. High Machs are less likely to be altruistic, and they are less likely to be concerned with the problems of others.

Alexithymia 
Alexithymia is considered a key trait correlated heavily with Machiavellianism. It is the lack of awareness of one's own emotions as well as the emotions of others. When tested, healthy alexithymic individuals have been found to obtain high Machiavellianism scores. This was not surprising to researchers, seeing as one of the core traits of Machiavellianism is unemotionality, similar to what alexithymics experience.

In the workplace

Machiavellianism is also studied by organizational psychologists, especially those who study manipulative behaviors in workplace settings. Workplace behaviors associated with this concept include flattery, deceit, coercion, and the abuse of others through one's position of leadership. These behaviors in the workplace are ultimately done to advance personal interests.

Research has shown that one's level of Machiavellianism can be a major factor in  situations where workplace manipulation is involved because this trait can have an effect on the ability for an individual to "fit" into a highly political work environment. Research has found individuals with Dark Triad traits are drawn to entrepreneurship. Certain qualities found in the Dark Triad are similar to traits needed for effective entrepreneurship, such as  confidence, charisma and risk taking.

Dimensions of the MACH scale

Although there have been myriad proposed factor structures, two dimensions emerge most consistently within factor-analytic research – differentiating Machiavellian views from behaviors. Although many posit that the Mach IV scale is unable to reliably capture the two dimensions, a 10-item subset of the scale known as the "two-dimensional Mach IV" (TDM-V), reproduces the views and tactics dimensions across countries, genders, sample types, and scale category length. The "Views" dimension appears to capture the neurotic, narcissistic, pessimistic, and distrustful aspects of Machiavellianism, while the "Tactics" component captures the more unconscientious, self-serving, and deceitful behavioral aspects.

Scale Evaluation
Psychologist John Rauthmann and others have stated that, while the MACH-IV is "a generally reliable and valid scale", it has it's shortcomings. These include the response styles of the test takers, the varying factor structures, and " insufficient content and construct validity". The researchers developed their own scale instead to study Machiavellianism multidimensionally instead of unidimensionally to prevent the construct from becoming hard to study effectively.

Game theory
In 2002, the Machiavellianism scale of Christie and Geis was applied by behavioral game theorists Anna Gunnthorsdottir, Kevin McCabe and Vernon L. Smith in their search for explanations for the spread of observed behavior in experimental games, in particular individual choices which do not correspond to assumptions of material self-interest captured by the standard Nash equilibrium prediction. It was found that in a trust game, those with high Mach-IV scores tended to follow Homo economicus equilibrium strategies while those with low Mach-IV scores tended to deviate from the equilibrium, and instead made choices that reflected widely accepted moral standards and social preferences.

See also

Amorality
Dark Triad Dirty Dozen
Deception
Light triad
Social dominance orientation

References

Further reading

 Christie, R., & Geis, F. L. (2013). Studies in machiavellianism. Academic Press.
 Jones, Daniel N., and Delroy L. Paulhus. "Machiavellianism." (2009).
 Fehr, B., & Samsom, D. (2013). The construct of machiavellianism: tvventy years later. Advances in personality assessment, 9, 77.
 Paulhus, Delroy L., and Kevin M. Williams. "The dark triad of personality: Narcissism, Machiavellianism, and psychopathy." Journal of research in personality 36.6 (2002): 556-563.
 Furnham, Adrian, Steven C. Richards, and Delroy L. Paulhus. "The Dark Triad of personality: A 10 year review." Social and personality psychology compass 7.3 (2013): 199-216.
 Lyons, M. (2019). The dark triad of personality: Narcissism, machiavellianism, and psychopathy in everyday life. Academic Press.
 Bereczkei, Tamás. Machiavellianism: The psychology of manipulation. Routledge, 2017.

External links
Interactive MACH IV test on the Open-Source Psychometrics Project
Meet the Machiavellians article in Psychology Today

Dark triad
 
Personality
Psychological manipulation